Bjørke Church may refer to:

Bjørke Church (Nannestad), a historic church in Nannestad Municipality, Viken county, Norway 
Bjørke Church (Volda), a church in Volda Municipality, Møre og Romsdal county, Norway

See also 
Björke Church, a church in Björke on the Swedish island of Gotland